The 1951 Northeastern Huskies football team represented Northeastern University during the 1951 college football season. It was the program's 16th season and they finished with an undefeated record of 6–0–1. Their head coach was Joe Zabilski and their captain was Sal Lombardo.

Schedule

References

Northeastern
Northeastern Huskies football seasons
College football undefeated seasons
Northeastern Huskies football